Edward F. "Big Ed" Simonich (January 11, 1916 – August 22, 1965) was an American football player and coach. He served as the head football coach at Carroll College in Butte, Montana from 1939 to 1941 and the Montana State School of Mines—now known as Montana Technological University—from 1957 to 1964.

Simonich was a college football player at the University of Notre Dame under coach Elmer Layden.

References

External links
 

1911 births
1965 deaths
American football fullbacks
Carroll Fighting Saints football coaches
Montana Tech Orediggers football coaches
Notre Dame Fighting Irish football players
High school football coaches in Iowa
High school football coaches in Montana
People from Ironwood, Michigan
Players of American football from Montana